Pierre Gentil (12 October 1881 – 4 April 1958) was a French sport shooter who competed in the 1912 Summer Olympics. He was born in Paris.

In 1912 at the Stockholm Games he participated in the following events:

 team 50 metre small-bore rifle - fourth place
 team free rifle - fourth place
 team rifle - fifth place
 25 metre small-bore rifle - 27th place
 300 metre military rifle, three positions - 61st place
 600 metre free rifle - 69th place
 300 metre free rifle, three positions - did not finish

References

1881 births
1958 deaths
French male sport shooters
ISSF rifle shooters
Olympic shooters of France
Shooters at the 1912 Summer Olympics
Sport shooters from Paris